Malta Air is a low-cost airline that operates from Malta.  It is a joint venture between Ryanair and the Government of Malta. 

The new airline initially operated six former Ryanair aircraft. Ryanair planned to assign 62 routes it operates to and from Malta to this new airline and there were plans to grow the network beyond that. However, these plans were revised in May 2020, when redundancy for one third of the full complement of 179 pilots and cabin crew was announced in response to the COVID-19 crisis.

History 
On 9 June 2019, Ryanair announced together with the Government of Malta that they were to set up a subsidiary airline called Malta Air, which was to consist of an initial fleet of 10 aircraft and the assumption the 61 flights then operated by Ryanair from the island. The fleet was to be registered in Malta while a new repair and maintenance hangar will also be set up. Ryanair will transfer all its existing Maltese operations to the new airline with its fleet expected to increase from 6 to 10 Boeing 737-800 aircraft and in Malta Air colours by mid-2020.

News aggregator Corporate Dispatch reported the first sighting of a Ryanair aircraft displaying an "operated by Malta Air" sticker just outside its front passenger door on 20 June 2019 at Stansted Airport. By the end of September 2019, further reports of Malta Air branding on Ryanair flights were being reported, including safety cards on the back of all passenger seats, as well as flight attendant and cockpit announcements, even though no further official notice of this was circulated to the general public.

When faced with the Covid-19 crisis in May 2020, Malta Air announced substantial redundancies for its pilots and cabin crew, after first proposing a 10% salary cut. Around 20 pilots and 40 cabin crew from the full complement of 179 pilots and cabin crew had their employment terminated from 30 June 2020.

In July 2021, Malta Air received its first Boeing 737 MAX 200. The aircraft, registered as 9H-VUE, was the first to be painted in the Malta Air livery. It was also the first aircraft to be delivered directly to Malta Air from the manufacturer, as its previous Boeing 737-800 aircraft had been transferred from its parent, Ryanair.

Destinations 
The company has planned to operate 66 routes from its Malta International Airport base starting in 2020. In addition to all the former Ryanair routes to and from Malta, Malta Air has added these destinations: Paphos in Cyprus; Brindisi, Trapani, and Trieste in Italy; Niš in Serbia; and Santiago de Compostela in Spain. Malta Air will also operate a service between Dublin and Vienna from 1 April 2020. Malta Air now operates the majority of Ryanair routes from/to Milan Bergamo Airport.

Fleet 

, Malta Air operates the following aircraft:

References

External links

Ryanair
Airlines of Malta
Airlines established in 2019
Low-cost carriers
Pietà, Malta